(+)-Naloxone (dextro-naloxone) is a drug which is the opposite enantiomer of the opioid antagonist drug (−)-naloxone. Unlike (-)-naloxone, (+)-naloxone has no significant affinity for opioid receptors, but instead has been discovered to act as a selective antagonist of Toll-like receptor 4. This receptor is involved in immune system responses, and activation of TLR4 induces glial activation and release of inflammatory mediators such as TNF-α and Interleukin-1.

Relation with opioids
Both active and inactive enantiomers of various opioid analgesic drugs including morphine, meperidine, fentanyl, methadone and buprenorphine, as well as some otherwise inactive metabolites like morphine-3-glucuronide, have been found to act as agonists of TLR4, and chronic use of these drugs consequently causes constant low-level release of TNF-α and IL-1β as well as other downstream effects. This is thought to be involved in various adverse properties of opioid analgesic drugs, such as loss of efficacy with extended use and the associated development of tolerance and dependence, as well as the development of side effects such as hyperalgesia and allodynia, which can cause long-term use of opioid analgesics to not only fail to treat neuropathic pain, but ultimately exacerbate it.

Applications of (+)-naloxone and related drugs
Several opioid antagonist drugs were found to act as antagonists for TLR4, including naloxone and naltrexone. However it was found that not only the (-) enantiomers, but also the (+) enantiomers of these drugs acted as TLR4 antagonists (though (+)-nalmefene was inactive). Since (+)-naloxone and (+)-naltrexone lack affinity for opioid receptors, they do not block the effects of opioid analgesic drugs, and so can be used to counteract the TLR4-mediated side effects of opioid agonists without affecting analgesia, though (+)-naloxone does reduce the reinforcing effects of opioid drugs. (+)-Naloxone was also found to be neuroprotective, and both (+)-naloxone and (+)-naltrexone are effective in their own right at treating symptoms of neuropathic pain in animal models. However (+)-naloxone was also found to reduce the effects of stimulant drugs, suggesting additional actions beyond TLR4 antagonism (possibly as a sigma receptor antagonist), that might potentially result in unwanted side effects or drug interactions.

See also 
 Dextromethorphan
 Eritoran
 Methylnaltrexone

References 

Experimental drugs
Allyl compounds